Karl John may refer to:

 Karl John (orienteer), Swiss orienteering competitor
 Karl John (actor), German actor